Pasaronas is a former municipality in the Ioannina regional unit, Greece. Since the 2011 local government reform it is part of the municipality Zitsa, of which it is a municipal unit. The municipal unit has an area of 135.278 km2. Population 9,238 (2011). The seat of the municipality was the village Eleousa.

References

Populated places in Ioannina (regional unit)